USS Harrisburg (LPD-30) will be the 14th San Antonio-class amphibious transport dock ship of the United States Navy. She will be the second ship in naval service named after the city of Harrisburg, Pennsylvania. Harrisburg is being built at Pascagoula, Mississippi, by Ingalls Shipbuilding. The ship will be the first Flight II variant of the San Antonio-class.

References

 

San Antonio-class amphibious transport docks
Proposed ships of the United States Navy